Dezembros is an album by Brazilian singer Maria Bethânia released in 1987.

Track listing
Anos Dourados (Tom Jobim/Chico Buarque)
Doce Espera (Marina Lima)
Errei sim (Ataulfo Alves)
Tranchan (Gonzaguinha)
Quero ficar com você (Caetano Veloso)
Gostoso demais (Dominguinhos/Nando Cordel)
Sei de cor (Celso Fonseca/Ronaldo Bastos)
Estrela do meu céu (Toninho Horta/Caetano Veloso)
Yorubahia (Roberto Mendes/Jorge Portugal)
Canções e Momentos (Milton Nascimento/Fernando Brant) featuring Milton Nascimento

References

1987 albums
Maria Bethânia albums
Albums produced by Caetano Veloso